Events from the year 1726 in Denmark.

Incumbents
 Monarch – Frederick IV
 Grand Chancellor – Ulrik Adolf Holstein

Events
 25 June  A fire breaks out in Viborg destroying more than 150 buildings.

Births
 24 March – Johanna Marie Fosie, first professional female Danish painter (died 1764)
 24 August – Peter Cramer, painter (died 1782)
 19 October – Princess Louise of Denmark, duchess of Saxe-Hildburghausen (died 1756 in Germany)
 5 December – Honoratus Bonnevie, physician (died 1811)

Deaths

References

 
1720s in Denmark
Denmark
Years of the 18th century in Denmark